Margaret Davidson  (1879-1978) a modern languages teacher in Dornoch, Sutherland in the Scottish Highlands, became a leader in the National Union of Women's Suffrage Societies (NUWSS), and one of the volunteer nurses in the Scottish Women's Hospital, in France during World War One, and an early leader of girl guiding in this area of Scotland.

Biography 
Davidson was born on 18 August 1879, into a family of teachers; both her parents (and two of her mother's sisters) being members of that profession. Davidson and her own younger sister attended St. Andrew's University until 1902, and she became a Modern Languages teacher, first in Dornoch's Burgh School, Schoolhill and moved with the institution to the new Dornoch Academy in 1913 (now the primary school).
Davidson stayed at a house called 'Oversteps', now a care home  which was the home a fellow suffragist, a young widow  Mrs. Rhyllis Llewellyn Hacon who had been a society 'hostess', and friend of artists Toulouse Lautrec and Charles Condor, in London and Paris. Mrs Hacon's earlier circle included Arthur Symons, author, whose book 'The Life of Lucy Newcombe was allegedly based on her, and she know Oscar Wilde, Aubrey Beardsley.

Hacon's home was also where Prime Minister H. H. Asquith resided on his annual holidays in Scotland.

Both women joined as volunteers to nurse injured soldiers near the front in France during World War One, Davidson serving from 1915 to 1917. Davidson was later a witness at Hacon's second marriage to a Canadian soldier, whom they had met whilst serving in France, Wiliam Robichaud in 1918.  On returning to Dornoch and resuming her teaching career, Davidson and her friend became Guiders (leaders of the Girl Guides movement) in the burgh.

Davidson and Hacon later took part in a 1928 tercentary Dornoch Pageant marking the granting of the Royal Charter to the Burgh of Dornoch by Charles I in 1628. Davidson continued to be active in the local community after her retirement in 1945, and she died in 1978, aged 98.

 Suffrage movement 
Davidson became the first Secretary of the Dornoch branch of National Union of Women's Suffrage Societies (NUWSS) in 1912. The branch was visited by leaders of the Scottish Federation of National Union of Women's Suffrage Societies in 1913;  and it grew to over 60 members. Women here also protested during the 1911 Census, by not participating in the enumeration of members of the households, because they were unable to vote.

Dornoch is in an area famous for its links golf courses, especially the Royal Dornoch Golf Club, and in those days it was (as most were), a male-only club. Members of the more militant Women's Social and Political Union (WSPU), the suffragettes, Lilias Mitchell and  Elsie Howey came here in 1912, and attacked the Prime Minister Asquith and Home Secretary Reginald McKenna on this course. The following year, a local suffragette, Miss Gibson, who lived at a house near the course called Briarfield', again approached the Prime Minister when he was out on this course, and knocked off his hat, but was escorted away by Mr. Ryle, Club Captain and Mr. McKenna, still smiling.

Volunteer war nurse 
Davidson gave up her teaching job to volunteer from May 1915  to help as an orderly then as a nurse to the wounded at the battlefront, in the Scottish Women's Hospital, at Royaumont, France.  These hospitals were founded by Dr. Elsie Inglis, a fellow suffragist, with financial support from NUWSS members and from private sources. Davidson served there 'under the thunder and boom of the great guns', continuously until 29 August 1917.

Nurse Davidson is listed on the First World War Roll of Honour, placed in the Dornoch Cathedral entrance porch. Mrs. Hacon also took part in this service to her country, but as a Roman Catholic, is not listed on the brass plaque.

Community leader 
After the war, some women were given the vote under the Representation of the People's Act 1918, and Davidson returned to her previous job, eventually promoted to Head of Subject (Modern Languages). Davidson and her friend Mrs. Hacon both became Girl Guides leaders in the town in 1931. Davidson continued to invigilator for examinations at her former school, for many years after retiring in 1945.

Davidson died on 16 February 1978, aged 98.

References

External links 

 Mapping Memorials to Women in Scotland https://womenofscotland.org.uk/keywords/teacher?page=1

Images 
 1907 School group Dunkeld Burgh School (Davidson is middle row (R)  http://www.historylinksarchive.org.uk/picture/number993.asp
 1910 Two women at Oversteps (thought to be Davidson and Hacon)  http://www.historylinksarchive.org.uk/picture/number2339.asp
 1923 Dornoch Academy Staff (Davidson is front row (2nd L)  http://www.historylinksarchive.org.uk/picture/number1480.asp

1870s births
1970s deaths
Women's suffrage in the United Kingdom
Scottish Women's Hospitals for Foreign Service volunteers
Girl Guiding and Girl Scouting
Dornoch
Scottish suffragettes
Alumni of the University of St Andrews